Poon Lim BEM (8 March 1918 – 4 January 1991) was a Chinese sailor who survived 133 days alone in the South Atlantic.

He soon found an  wooden raft with supplies. When the supplies ran low, Lim resorted to fishing, catching seabirds, and rain collection.

On 5 April 1943, Lim was rescued by three Brazilian fishermen as he neared the coast of Brazil. After his return to the United Kingdom, Lim was awarded a British Empire Medal by King George VI. After the war, Lim emigrated to the United States.

World War II 

Lim was born on China's Hainan Island on 8 March 1918. In 1942, during World War II, he was working as second steward on the British armed merchant ship , which was on its way from Cape Town to Paramaribo and New York. The ship was armed but slow moving and was sailing alone instead of in a convoy.

The ship sank  from the nearest land to the South, but ocean currents took him west to Belém. As the ship was sinking, he took a life jacket and jumped overboard before the ship's boilers exploded.

Benlomond sank in approximately two minutes, allowing only six survivors, including Lim, to abandon ship. After approximately two hours in the water, Lim found and climbed aboard a wooden raft. The raft had several tins of biscuits, a  jug of water, some chocolate, a bag of sugar lumps, some flares, two smoke pots, and a flashlight. Lim was ultimately the only survivor of the sinking. 53 of the crew of 54 were lost at sea, including the master, John Maul, 44 crew, and eight gunners.

Lim initially kept himself alive by drinking the water and eating the food on the raft, but later resorted to fishing and catching rainwater in a canvas life jacket covering. He could not swim very well and often tied a rope from the boat to his wrist, in case he fell into the ocean. He took a wire from the flashlight and made it into a fishhook, and used hemp rope as a fishing line. He also dug a nail out of the boards on the wooden raft and bent it into a hook for larger fish. When he captured a fish, he would cut it open with a knife he fashioned out of a biscuit tin and dry it on a hemp line over the raft. Once, a large storm hit and spoiled his fish and fouled his water. Lim, barely alive, caught a bird and drank its blood to survive.

When he saw sharks, he refrained from swimming and sought to catch one, using the remnants of birds he had caught as bait. The first shark to pick up the taste was only a few feet away from his raft. He gulped the bait and hit the line with full force, but in preparation Lim had braided the line so it would have double thickness. He also had wrapped his hands in canvas to enable him to make the catch. The shark attacked him after he brought it aboard the raft, so he used the water jug half-filled with seawater as a weapon. After subduing the shark, Lim cut it open and sucked the blood from its liver. Since it had not rained, he was out of water and this quenched his thirst. He sliced off the fins and let them dry in the sun.

On several occasions he was passed by other vessels. The first was an unidentified freighter whose crew saw him but did not pick him up or even greet him despite his proficient shouts in English. Lim contended that they would not rescue him because he was Asian and they may have assumed he was a stricken Japanese sailor, although another explanation is that German U-boats often set a "survivor" on a raft as a trap to get a rescuing ship to stop which made it a sitting duck to be sunk. A squadron of United States Navy patrol seaplanes did see him, and one dropped a marker buoy in the water. Unfortunately for Lim, a large storm hit the area at the same time and he was lost again. He was also once spotted by a German U-boat, which had been doing gunnery drills by targeting gulls.

At first, he counted the days by tying knots in a rope, but later decided that there was no point in counting the days and simply began counting full moons.

Land

On 5 April 1943, after 133 days in the life raft, Lim neared land and a river inlet. A few days earlier, he had realized that he was nearing land because the color of the water had changed; it was no longer a deep ocean blue. Three Brazilian fishermen rescued him and took him to Belém three days later.

During his ordeal, Lim lost , but was able to walk unaided upon being rescued. He spent four weeks in a Brazilian hospital while the British Consul arranged for him to return to Britain via Miami and New York.

When told no one had ever survived longer on a raft at sea, Lim replied, "I hope no one will ever have to break that record." People have since lived longer lost at sea: three Mexican sailors floated for 10 months from 2005 to 2006 in the Pacific Ocean in a disabled fishing boat. In a similar situation, José Salvador Alvarenga, a fisherman from El Salvador, was apparently lost for 439 days, floating from Mexico to the Marshall Islands. , no one has broken Lim's record on a life raft.

Aftermath 
King George VI bestowed a British Empire Medal on him, and the Royal Navy incorporated his tale into manuals of survival techniques. After the war, Lim decided to emigrate to the United States, but the quota for Chinese immigrants had been reached. However, because of his fame and the aid of Senator Warren Magnuson, he received a special dispensation and eventually gained citizenship.  The writer Alfred Bester later stated that Lim's ordeal was used in his novel The Stars My Destination, which opens with a man stranded in space.

Lim died in Brooklyn on 4 January 1991 aged 72.

See also 
 Dougal Robertson – survived 38 days adrift in the Pacific Ocean
 José Salvador Alvarenga – survived 438 days adrift in the Pacific Ocean
 Louis Zamperini – survived 47 days adrift in the Pacific Ocean
 Maurice and Maralyn Bailey – survived 117 days adrift in the Pacific Ocean
 Steven Callahan – survived 76 days adrift in the Atlantic Ocean

General
List of people who disappeared mysteriously at sea

Further reading
 Article in The Daily Telegraph on the 75th anniversary of Lim's rescue

Footnotes

External links 
 

1918 births
1940s missing person cases
1991 deaths
British Merchant Navy personnel of World War II
Castaways
Chinese emigrants to the United States
Formerly missing people
Missing person cases in Brazil
People from Hainan
Recipients of the British Empire Medal
Sole survivors